Tibbals is an English patronymic surname. Notable people with the surname include:

 Chauntelle Tibbals, American sociologist
 Howard C. Tibbals (born 1936), American artist
 Todd Tibbals (1910–1988), American architect

See also

References 

English-language surnames
Patronymic surnames